Plaxiphora australis is a very small species of chiton in the family Mopaliidae.

Distribution
New Zealand

References
 Powell A. W. B., New Zealand Mollusca, William Collins Publishers Ltd, Auckland, New Zealand 1979 

Mopaliidae
Molluscs described in 1907